Bloodwork is the fourth and final studio album by American metalcore band Texas in July. The album was released on September 16, 2014, through Equal Vision Records, and is the band's only album to feature vocalist J.T. Cavey.

Track listing

References 

2014 albums
Texas in July albums
Equal Vision Records albums